Miss Maurice or Éstrella Mauritius Organization is a national Beauty pageant in Mauritius. The pageant was founded in 2016, where the winners were sent to Miss Universe.

History
The Miss Estrella pageant was established by Nevin Rupear in 2016. The main purpose is promoting the Mauritian flair and beauty. Beside on that point, the Miss Estrella winner also has a chance to represent Mauritius to the Miss Universe. In 2020 the organization named it as Miss Maurice.

Began in 2016 Miss Estrella Mauritius became the national franchise for Miss Universe. Before holding Miss Estrella, the Miss Universe Mauritius representatives were selected by Miss Mauritius pageant's winner.

In 2018 Miss Estrella started to send representatives to Miss Supranational. The Mister Estrella Mauritius will represent Mauritius at upcoming annual Mr. Supranational contest.

Appointments
On May 29, 2016 Kushboo Ramnawaj (former Miss Mauritius 2014) appointed as the first Miss Estrella Mauritius by Miss Estrella Organization. Due to personal problems, she did not compete at the Miss Universe 2015.

Editions
The first edition of Miss Estrella Mauritius was scheduled to take place in 2018 with 24 regional sashes.

Titleholders

Wins by district — Miss Maurice

Wins by district — Mister Maurice

Titleholders under Estrella Mauritius org.

Miss Universe Mauritius
 

Miss Estrella Mauritius has started to send a Miss Mauritius to Miss Universe from 2016. Between 1975 and 2015 Miss Mauritius franchised the Miss Universe to the main winner. On occasion, when the winner does not qualify (due to age) for either contest, a runner-up is sent.

Miss Mauritius 1975-2015
 

Between 1975 and 2015 the Miss Mauritius Organization set its winner to Miss Universe. On occasion, when the winner does not qualify (due to age) for either contest, a runner-up is sent.

Miss Supranational Mauritius

Miss Estrella Mauritius has started to send a Miss Mauritius to Miss Supranational from 2018. The second title crowned as "Miss Supranational Mauritius".

Mister Supranational Mauritius

Miss Estrella Mauritius produced Mister Maurice for the first time in 2021. The winner represents Mauritius at Mister Supranational pageant.

See also

 Miss Mauritius

References

External links

Mauritius
Mauritius
Recurring events established in 2016
Beauty pageants in Mauritius